A claw crane, claw machine, toy crane, or skill crane is a type of arcade game known as a merchandiser, commonly found in video arcades, supermarkets, restaurants, movie theaters, shopping malls, and bowling alleys.

Machine components

A claw crane consists of many parts, but the basic components are a printed circuit board (PCB), power supply, currency detector, credit/timer display, joystick, wiring harness / loom, gantry assembly, coil, and claw assembly. The claw has three fingers if it is a traditional design or two fingers if it is the Asian-style "UFO" machines. Rarely, there are four.

Claw machine gantry assemblies typically consist of two main moving carriages. The first controls the movement along the forward and back axis. This is the long moving set of rails. On these rails sits the gantry carriage, or gantry box. This is the actual component the claw is suspended from, and it contains the motors for sideways movement, alongside the motor and pulleys for the movement of the claw on the Y-axis. These gantries also contain a series of small electronic switches, which are responsible for letting the main PCB know when the carriages have reached their limits of movement, as well as when the claw is at the top or bottom.

The main cabinets for claw machines are typically constructed of medium-density fiberboard, with wooden or metal inner support structures.  Some more modern cabinets are made of aluminum alloy, which makes it easier to relocate as well as cheaper to produce. A lot of very high-end claw machines have full LED lighting on the front, behind a partially-transparent plastic panel, first popularised by Elaut of Belgium on their IntraXion E-Claw cranes.

The top half of the machine normally consists of a metal frame, with tempered safety glass windows. The machine's marquee, typically located above or behind the top of the glass window, is typically an acrylic panel with a graphic depicting bold lettering, that reads the model of the machine.

The crane machine playing field is the platform on which the prizes sit, typically constructed of aluminum alloy or MDF. This is normally covered with fish gravel or polystyrene packing peanuts for decorative purposes or as a riser to lower or raise prizes. Fish gravel is normally used for machines where there are gaps between prizes, such as jewelry cranes or set payout machines, as it is more aesthetically appealing than packing peanuts. However, it is a more expensive option, while packing peanuts are more common in countries like the United Kingdom. In some machines, such as UFO Catchers in Japan, plastic balls are used for decoration.

Gameplay and prize types

The goal of the game is to manipulate the claw inside of the cabinet in order to grab a desired prize inside, which is then dispensed and collected by the player if they are successful. The specific methods of controlling the claw differ between machines.

Typically in Asia and Europe, claw machines use the skill intensive "up and across" gameplay system. This is where the player is provided with two buttons, one for forward movement, and one for sideways movement. Each button can only be pressed once, and as soon as the final button is released, the claw is dropped. This was the original system for motion used on machines since the 1960s, and is most popular in countries like the United Kingdom and Japan.

Another method of movement for claw machines is the ever popular joystick control. This is when the player has full control of the claw in all directions, and a separate button is used to deploy the claw. This is becoming much more popular, as it makes claw machines much easier for the inexperienced.

Another method of claw movement is the very old electro-mechanical style of movement, in which the player moves the claw with a small wheel before inserting money. The claw drops immediately when money is inserted and is powered by a single motor. The claw mechanism closes when the drop string is pulled. This is a very rare type of machine to find, with a few UK examples being found in Brighton Penny Arcades. These machines typically were manufactured pre-1960s.

Claw machines were initially designed to take small prizes like sweets (candy) or jewelry or even cigarettes. However, they moved more towards the children's toy market as machines got larger and more capable.

Machine configuration and chances of winning
The majority of modern machines have an operator-adjustable payout rate. This is when the operator can set how much profit they want to make from each prize. Often, this is set up  based on prize value. For example, if a prize is worth $5, and the operator chooses to make an extra $5 of profit on top of that, then the machine needs to pay out after $10 has been inserted.

Modern claw machines are fully computerized and are remotely programmable by the owner (via a hand-held device). Settings and features commonly available include:

 Claw strength and aperture
 Claw movement speed, either as a whole, or in individual axis.
 Pick-up strength (on skill-based machines)
 Primary and secondary strength settings
 Toy teasing on payout based machines—when toy teasing is enabled, the claw will pick up a prize for a set amount of time before dropping it, giving the player the impression that they nearly won
 Operator adjustable payout rate: The percentage of how often the machine will pay out a prize in relation to the value of the merchandise and the operators preferred profit.
 Overpay: If the machine pays out over a certain number of prizes in a set amount of time more than its set payout, it will throw up an error code, and prevent anyone from inserting money, and prompt them to get an attendant. This eliminates the possibility of people emptying a potentially faulty machine.  
 Instant Free Play: When the machine will give the player a free play if enough money is inserted. This is popular on ICE, Cromptons and Brents X-Factor machines.
 Instant Replay: When the player can drop the claw in the exact same position before it has returned to the home position, at the cost of one credit. The feature is disabled if the user has less than two credits. This feature is popular on the Elaut Intelli or IntraXion machines.

Older machines are known to be retrofitted with devices called crane processors. This gives skill based machines the necessary technology in order to be rigged. The best and most common version of this in the UK is the Lottelle "The WON" processor. Processors are most popular in the UK, where small arcades choose them over replacing their machines.

Some cranes are also able to display the number and value of prizes won in a given time period, enabling the owner to keep track of how profitable the machine is for them.

Claw machines holding expensive prizes, such as a video game console or a mobile phone are typically programmed so that the grip strength of the claw is determined according to a payout percentage that is profitable to the operator. Experienced skill crane players also say that box shaped prizes are among the most difficult kinds of objects to pick up with any claw, regardless of its settings.

Legality
The ability of the crane machine owner to set features such as a payout percentage raises the question of whether these machines should be considered gambling devices in a legal sense, alongside slot machines. In the United States, claw vending machines are typically specifically exempted from statutes which regulate gambling devices, contingent upon compliance with certain rules. In the state of Michigan, for example, this exemption applies only if the wholesale value of the prizes inside is below a certain threshold, and if these prizes are actually retrievable with the claw. Other states regulate crane machines very little. In addition, some attorneys have advised claw machine owners to avoid using the word "skill" in the game description decal present on most machines.

In other jurisdictions, such as Alberta, Canada, skill cranes are illegal unless the player is allowed to make repeated attempts (on a single credit) until he or she wins a prize. Skill cranes in single-play mode (where the player has only one chance per credit to try for a prize) were found by the Ontario Court of Appeal to be essentially games of chance, and therefore prohibited except at fairs or exhibitions, where they are covered by an exemption.

Global popularity

Asia
In Japan, modern trolley-style claw machines began being manufactured by Sega and Taito in the 1960s. Sega released its first modern electro-mechanical (EM) arcade crane game, Skill Diga, in 1965, and followed it with Super Skill Diga (1968), which included dolls as prizes. By the 1970s, Sega and Taito machines had drawn the attention of plush toy vendors, with the machines used to display and deploy stuffed animals, evolving into modern claw machines.

They gained popularity in Japan during the late 1970s, with crane games among Japan's top ten highest-grossing EM arcade games of 1977, and then Sega's magnetic crane machine the sixth highest-grossing EM arcade game of 1978.

By the 1980s, crane machines had become much larger, with plush dolls the major prizes, and cranes common at carnivals and arcades. A boom in crane games occurred with the release of Sega's UFO Catcher in 1985, and since then the term "UFO catcher" has become synonymous with crane games in Japan. It stood out for its eagle claw shape, hence the name "UFO" catcher, along with its kawaii (cute) family-friendly design, helping to make them more marketable to casual audiences. Two players could also operate cranes simultaneously, intended to encourage more social interaction, such as between couples. Sega's UFO Catcher series led to claw cranes becoming increasingly popular in Japan during the 1980s to 1990s. By 1994, Sega had sold over 40,000 UFO Catcher cabinets, with the term UFO Catcher itself becoming synonymous with crane games in Japan.

Claw cranes gradually became popular across other parts of Asia as well, such as South Korea and China, during the 1990s to 2000s.

United States
In the early 20th century, popular photographs of the excavation of the Panama Canal made the steam shovel into an object of popular fascination. This trend inspired novelty candy dispensers made to look like steam shovels. Players would put a nickel into the slot of a glass-fronted cabinet and crank a wheel to engage a series of internal gears. The tiny bucket-jaws swung down, closed over a piece of candy, rose, and dropped the sweet into a chute where it could be retrieved. Early versions of these games include the Panama Digger, Erie Digger, and Iron Claw. The most successful model was the Miami Digger patented by carnival operator William Bartlett in 1932.  The prizes were silver dollars or rolls of coins, and Bartlett operated the machines himself rather than selling them.  Over the decades, the mechanics and aesthetics of these candy dispensers evolved into the modern claw games of today.

A claw machine labeled "Toy Steam Shovel" appears in a drugstore in the cartoon Naughty but Mice (1939) featuring Sniffles the Mouse.

In Davis Grubb's 1971 novel, The Barefoot Man, set in 1930 in West Virginia, Jack Farjeon wants to get a gun in secret and is challenged to retrieve one from a crane game, at a price of $10 a play, with the first play free.  He gets the gun after seven tries.

Following the arrival of Japanese and European claw machines in the late 1970s, these machines became popular in the United States in the late 1980s, with a significant presence at Pizza Hut restaurants, although they were to be found much earlier. Later on, the machines spread to other venues, and by the early 1990s, the NFL began to advertise their teams with stuffed footballs of each team placed in some of the machines. Soon after, the MLB, NBA, and NHL also started doing this, although the NBA no longer uses these machines as a means of advertisement.

By the mid-1990s, the machines' popularity had made such establishments as Safeway, Fry's Supermarkets, K-Mart, and Wal-Mart a staple of their locations. Some hotels also acquired them to satisfy their younger guests, as did sports venues that would stuff them with collectibles related to their home teams.

In the 1995 Disney/Pixar computer-animated film Toy Story, Buzz Lightyear and Sheriff Woody climb into a claw vending machine filled with claw-worshipping aliens.

In the SpongeBob SquarePants season 4 episode "Skill Crane", Mr. Krabs introduces the skill crane machine to SpongeBob and Squidward in the Krusty Krab.

References

External links

 "Claw machines are rigged—here's why it's so hard to grab that stuffed animal" by Phil Edwards, Vox

Arcade games
Merchandisers